Caeneressa robusta is a moth of the family Erebidae. It was described by Jeremy Daniel Holloway in 1976. It is found on Borneo.

References

Syntomini
Moths described in 1976